Aphelia alleniana, the wide-striped leafroller, is a species of moth of the family Tortricidae. It is found in North America, where it has been recorded throughout Canada, as far north as Alaska. In the United States, it has been recorded from Colorado, Maine and Montana.

The wingspan is 21–27 mm. The forewings are light brown with fine darker brown reticulations. The hindwings are dull greyish brown. Adults are on wing from late June to mid-July.

The larvae mostly feed on herbaceous plants, but may also feed on deciduous and coniferous woody plants. The larvae are light green with a dark green dorsal stripe and a yellow head. The species overwinters as a third instar larva in a folded leaf.

Subspecies
Aphelia alleniana alleniana
Aphelia alleniana rindgeorum Obraztsov, 1959

References

Moths described in 1882
Aphelia (moth)
Moths of North America